The Moyes Sonic is an Australian high-wing, single-place, hang glider that was designed and produced by Moyes Delta Gliders of Botany, New South Wales. Now out of production, when it was available the aircraft was supplied complete and ready-to-fly.

Design and development
The Sonic was designed as a beginner and intermediate glider with a 60% double surface wing and neutral static balance for improved maneuverability.

The aircraft is made from 7075-T6 aluminum tubing, with the double-surface wing covered in 4 oz Dacron sailcloth. The aircraft was produced in two models, the 165 and 190, designated by their wing area in square feet.

Variants
Sonic 165
Small-sized model for lighter pilots. Its  span wing is cable braced from a single kingpost.
Sonic 190
Large-sized model for heavier pilots. Its  span wing is cable braced from a single kingpost. This model has a variable geometry system.

Specifications (Sonic 190)

References

External links

Sonic
Hang gliders